is a Japanese professional shogi player ranked 4-dan.

Early life and apprenticeship
Okabe was born in Tsuruoka, Yamagata Prefecture on April 8, 1999. He learned how to play shogi from watching his older brother and grandfather play, and eventually was accepted into the Japan Shogi Association's (JSA) apprentice school at the rank of 6-kyū as a student of shogi professional  in September 2011. 

Okabe was promoted to the rank of apprentice professional 3-dan in 2016. He obtained full professional status and the corresponding rank of 4-dan in April 2022 after tying for first with Kenshi Tokuda in the 70th 3-dan League (October 2021March 2022) with a record of 15 wins and 3 losses.

Promotion history
The promotion history for Okabe is as follows.

6-kyū: September 2011
3-dan: October 2016
4-dan: April 1, 2022

References

External links
 ShogiHub: Professional Player Info · Reo Okabe

Living people
1999 births
Japanese shogi players
Professional shogi players
Professional shogi players from Yamagata Prefecture